Sell Your Soul is the first full-length album from Burlington, Ontario's The Creepshow. The album was released by Stereo Dynamite and distributed by EMI Music Canada.

The album features eleven tracks, ten of which are original songs. The first track, "The Sermon" is a spoken word introduction by organ player The Reverend McGinty in a Vincent Price-inspired voice.

Music videos were released for both "Zombies Ate Her Brain" and "The Garden."

Tracks
 "The Sermon"  (0:33)
 "Creatures of the Night"  (2:42)
 "Shake"  (3:38)
 "Sell Your Soul"  (2:41)
 "Cherry Hill"  (2:57)
 "Candy Kiss"  (3:48)
 "Grave Diggers"  (2:03)
 "Zombies Ate Her Brain"  (1:29)
 "The Garden"  (3:36)
 "Doghouse"  (4:37)
 "Psycho Ball & Chain"  (2:48)

Band members
 Sean "Sickboy" McNab - Upright Bass / Backup Vocals
 Jen "Hellcat" Blackwood - Guitar / Lead Vocals
 Paul "The Reverend" McGinty - Keys / Backup Vocals
 Matt "Pomade" Gee - drums

Other Contributors
 Steve Rizun - Producer, Recording, Mixing and Mastering.
 Orchard Studios - Drum and Bass Recording.
 Doghouse Music, Lyrics and additional Guitar by Hooch of The Matadors.
 Harmonica on The Garden by Sarah Blackwood.
 All Background Vocals by The Creepshow and SnaX Rebo.
 Design and Photography by Ashlea Wessel at Revolver Photography.
 Illustrations by Jen "Hellcat" Blackwood.
 Psycho Ball and Chain lyric inspiration by Emma

References

External links
Stereo Dynamite
thecreepshow.org

The Creepshow albums
2006 albums